East Sandy Creek is a tributary of the Allegheny River in Northwestern Pennsylvania in the United States.

East Sandy Creek joins the Allegheny River approximately 5 miles (8 km) downstream of Franklin.

The East Sandy Creek Rapids are rated for paddlers with a usual difficulty of I-II (for normal flows).

Political subdivisions
The political subdivisions traverses, given in the order they are encountered traveling downstream, are as follows:
Washington Township
Elk Township
Pinegrove Township
Ashland Township
Cranberry Township
Rockland Township

Tributaries
The named tributaries of East Sandy Creek, given in the order they are encountered traveling downstream, are as follows:

Richland Run
Prairie Run
Cogley Run
Little East Sandy Creek
Tarkiln Run
Pine Run
Shaw Run
Shannon Run
Pryor Run
Halls Run
Browns Run
Porcupine Run
Burford Run

See also
Tributaries of the Allegheny River#East Sandy Creek
List of rivers of Pennsylvania

References

External links
 Sandy Creek Trail

Rivers of Pennsylvania
Tributaries of the Allegheny River
Rivers of Venango County, Pennsylvania